Eric Arthur Percy Cockroft (10 September 1890 – 2 April 1973) was a New Zealand rugby union player. A wing and full-back, Cockroft represented Otago and South Canterbury at a provincial level, and was a member of the New Zealand national side, the All Blacks, in 1913 and 1914. He played seven matches for the All Blacks including three internationals.

References

1890 births
1973 deaths
New Zealand rugby union players
New Zealand international rugby union players
People educated at Southland Boys' High School
University of Otago alumni
New Zealand schoolteachers
New Zealand military personnel of World War I
South Canterbury rugby union players
Otago rugby union players
Rugby union wings
Rugby union fullbacks
Rugby union players from Otago